Dermot Boyd is a Northern Irish-born television director. Programmes he has directed include: The Return, Four Fathers, Feather Boy, Johnny and the Bomb, Drop Dead Gorgeous, Rough Diamond, Whistleblower, Casualty, and Holby City. He is husband of the writer Janet Behan. A further list of production credits can be found at the IMDb.

References

External links 
 For article about Whistleblower, see RTÉ website

Television directors from Northern Ireland
Living people
Year of birth missing (living people)